Nikos Giannakopoulos (born 19 February 1993) is a Greek professional footballer who plays as a goalkeeper for Moldovan Super Liga club Zimbru Chișinău.

Career 
Giannakopoulos started his career in the youth team of Asteras Tripolis, before he joined the youth team of English club Blackburn Rovers in 2009. After a period of a year he joined the youth team of Italian club Udinese Calcio.

He soon however was released and returned to his country joining Panionios. On 27 August 2012, he made his league debut against Aris.  He has been the first-choice keeper for the club since the early part of 2013. There was a brief period when Kostas Peristeridis displaced him from top spot again after young Giannakapoulos oversaw a run of 3 straight defeats. But he regained his spot later in the 2013–14 season and has been the first choice ever since. Arguably his best performance came in the early part of his career when he kept a clean sheet against Greek giants, Panathanaikos. He repeated this feat the following season as Panionios beat Panathanaikos 3–0 with Giannakopoulos as a main goalie.

On 29 July 2015, Giannakopoulos signed his four (three years with an option for an additional one) years' contract with Greek giants Panathinaikos for €180,000, adding another high-caliber Greek talent to their squad. On 17 April 2016, in the last game of the 2015–16 season, he made his debut with the club in a 6–1 home win against Panthrakikos. As he is not among the first priorities of Panathinaikos coach Andrea Stramaccioni he signed a long-term year loan with Cypriot club Aris Limassol FC.

On 26 June 2017, Giannakopoulos signed a two-year contract with Kerkyra.

On 4 July 2018, following Kerkyra's relegation to Football League, he joined Panetolikos on a two-year deal.

Career statistics

References

External links 
 

1993 births
Living people
Association football goalkeepers
Greek footballers
Super League Greece players
Cypriot First Division players
Panionios F.C. players
Panathinaikos F.C. players
Aris Limassol FC players
PAE Kerkyra players
Expatriate footballers in Cyprus
Greek expatriates in Cyprus
Greek expatriate footballers
Greece youth international footballers
Footballers from Tripoli, Greece